John Powers may refer to:

Sportspeople
John Powers (American football coach), college football player and coach
John Powers (baseball) (1929–2001), baseball outfielder
John T. Powers (20th century), president of the Federal League of baseball
John Powers (tight end) (1940–1978), National Football League football player
John Powers (cricketer) (1868–1939), right-handed batsman from Leicestershire

Others
John Powers (academic) (born 1957), American-born professor of Asian studies and Buddhism
John Powers (alderman) (1852–1930), Chicago alderman in the late 19th and early 20th centuries
John Powers (mayor), former mayor of Spokane, Washington
John A. Powers (1922–1979), public affairs officer for NASA
John C. Powers (1883–1914), Arizona deputy sheriff better known as Maricopa Slim
John E. Powers (1910–1998), American politician in the Massachusetts Senate
John Emory Powers (1837–1919), copywriter
John Holbrook Powers (1831–1918), Nebraska pioneer
John J. Powers (food scientist) (1918–2014), professor emeritus of food science
John James Powers (1912–1942), United States Navy officer and Medal of Honor recipient
John R. Powers (1945–2013), American novelist and playwright
John Robert Powers (1892–1977), American actor and owner of a modeling agency
John Powers (journalist) (born 1948), journalist and author

See also 
Jack Power (disambiguation)
Johnny Powers (disambiguation)
John Power (disambiguation)
Jack Powers (1827–1860), Irish-American gambler and gang leader
Jon Powers, American political activist